Thomas Lyle may refer to:

Tom Lyle (1953–2019), American comic book artist
Thomas Ranken Lyle (1860–1944), Irish physicist, radiologist and rugby union international player
Thomas Lyle (antiquarian) (1792–1852), author of Ancient Ballads and Songs